Mr. Mean is the 13th album by the Ohio Players, and the 7th album recorded for Mercury. It is the soundtrack to the eponymous 1977 film. The band's roster grew, this time from eight to nine members with the entrance of Robert "C.D." Jones on congas.

With the band's popularity higher than ever, the Ohio Players were asked by actor Fred Williamson to create music for a movie of the same name he was writing and directing.  Some sessions for the album were recorded, like previous albums, at Paragon Recording Studio in Chicago, but this project brought them into Los Angeles for the first time to record music.  The songs were a departure from the mid-tempo funk and soul they were becoming known for, especially compared to the album they released months before, Angel.  The group placed a greater emphasis in incorporating more ballads and jazz of the quiet storm variety.

The music was made for the sole purpose of it being used for the eponymous 1977 film, perhaps the reason why it felt like a departure from their previous work, but fans and critics reacted to it with mixed opinions.

Mr. Mean was also the first time the entire band were seen on the cover posing with their model.

Track listing
All tracks composed by Billy Beck, James "Diamond" Williams, Marshall Jones, Marvin "Merv" Pierce, Ralph "Pee Wee" Middlebrooks, Clarence Satchell and Leroy "Sugarfoot" Bonner
 "Mr. Mean" (5:16)
 "Fight Me, Chase Me" (5:10)
 "The Controller's Mind" (1:36)
 "The Big Score" (7:34)
 "Magic Trick" (6:56)
 "Good Luck Charm" (9:36)
 "Speak Easy" (3:52)

Later samples
"Good Luck Charm"
"Last Words" by Nas from the album Nastradamus

Personnel
Clarence "Satch" Satchell - flute, alto saxophones, tenor saxophones, rhythm king, percussion, and vocals
Leroy "Sugarfoot" Bonner - guitars, percussion, and lead vocals
Marshall "Rock" Jones - electric bass
Ralph "Pee Wee" Middlebrooks - trumpets & trombones
James "Diamond" Williams - drums, vibes, cowbell, percussion, and vocals
Billy Beck - Grand piano, Fender Rhodes piano, Hohner D-6 Clavinet, RMI Electric piano, ARP Odyssey Synthesizer, ARP string ensemble, Hammond B-3 organ, percussion, and vocals
Marvin "Merv" Pierce - trumpets, trombones & flugelhorn
Clarence "Chet" Willis - rhythm guitar & vocals
Robert "Rumba" Jones - congas

Charts

Singles

References

External links
 Mr. Mean at Discogs

1977 albums
Ohio Players albums
Mercury Records albums